Not in Our Genes: Biology, Ideology and Human Nature is a 1984 book by the evolutionary geneticist Richard Lewontin, the neurobiologist Steven Rose, and the psychologist Leon Kamin, in which the authors criticize sociobiology and genetic determinism and advocate a socialist society.

The book formed part of a larger campaign against sociobiology. Its authors were praised for their criticism of IQ testing and were complimented by some for their critique of sociobiology. However, they have been criticized for misrepresenting the views of scientists such as the biologist E. O. Wilson and the ethologist Richard Dawkins, for using “determinism” and “reductionism” simply as terms of abuse, and for the influence of Marxism on their views. Critics have seen its authors’ conclusions as political rather than scientific.

Summary
Lewontin, Rose and Kamin identify themselves as "respectively an evolutionary geneticist, a neurobiologist, and a psychologist." They criticize biological determinism and reductionism, and state that they share a commitment to the creation of a socialist society and a recognition that "a critical science is an integral part of the struggle to create that society". Their understanding of science draws on ideas suggested by Karl Marx and Friedrich Engels and developed by Marxist scholars in the 1930s. They also draw on the ideas of the Marxist philosopher György Lukács, as put forward in History and Class Consciousness (1923), as well as the ideas of the Marxist philosopher Ágnes Heller and the communist revolutionary Mao Zedong. They discuss and criticize the views of authors such as E. O. Wilson, Richard Dawkins, and Donald Symons. They criticize Wilson's Sociobiology: The New Synthesis (1975). They maintain that, like some other sociobiologists, Symons maintains that "the manifest trait is not itself coded by genes, but that a potential is coded and the trait only arises when the appropriate environmental cue is given." In their view, "Despite its superficial appearance of dependence on environment, this model is completely genetically determined, independent of the environment." They write that Symons' arguments in The Evolution of Human Sexuality (1979) provide examples "of how sociobiological theory can explain anything, no matter how contradictory, by a little mental gymnastics".

Publication history
Not in Our Genes was first published by Pantheon Books in 1984. Later that year it was published by Pelican Books. In 1990, it was published by Penguin Books.

Reception

Mainstream media
Not in Our Genes received positive reviews from the columnist Gene Lyons in Newsweek and the paleontologist Stephen Jay Gould in The New York Review of Books, a mixed review from the philosopher Philip Kitcher in The New York Times Book Review, and negative reviews from the anthropologist Melvin Konner in Natural History and the biologist Patrick Bateson and the ethologist Richard Dawkins in New Scientist. The editors of New Scientist noted that the book would "inevitably attract either extreme criticism or glowing praise" depending on the reviewer's stance on sociobiology, and that they published two reviews to help encourage debate, having approached Dawkins "for the opposition" and Bateson, "who feels that the attack on genetic determinism is justified." The book was also reviewed by the psychologist Sandra Scarr in American Scientist, Nathaniel S. Lehrman in The Humanist, and by The Wilson Quarterly and Science News.

Lyons described the book as a "spirited, if often repetitive, demolition of sociobiology's pretensions", adding that its authors' arguments were "made doubly impressive" by their "analysis of how the economic determinism of what they call '“vulgar” Marxism' and the spinelessness of 'sociological relativism' have contributed to a climate in which the speculations of sociobiology have found a hearing." Gould described the book as "important and timely". He credited Lewontin et al. with exposing the fallacies of biological determinism (though he noted that theirs was only one critique among many), and presenting a view of human behavior that went beyond the controversy over nature and nurture. However, he believed that while they exposed problems with research on schizophrenia, they did not reveal "fatal and debilitating flaws". He agreed with Lewontin et al. that "interactionism is also based on deep fallacies and cultural biases that play into the hands of biological determinism", showing that it is guilty of the fallacy of "reductionism".

Kitcher described the book as "informative, entertaining, lucid, forceful, frequently witty, occasionally unfair, sometimes intemperate, never dull". He  praised Lewontin et al.′s discussion of intelligence, and complimented their discussions of sex differences and the use of drugs and surgery to modify behavior. He was less convinced by their discussion of schizophrenia, writing that in it their "policy of treating their opponents as patsies begins to seem unjustified". Konner believed that the book's authors provided an "acceptable review of the dismal historical record of abuse of ideas in behavioral genetics" but that this history had received better discussions. He criticized Lewontin et al. for giving little attention to "similar abuses that have occurred under political systems that espouse a cultural-determinist ideology." He accused them of falsely attributing a belief in "heredity privilege" to advocates of IQ testing, employing tactics such as guilt through association, providing misleading discussions of issues in psychiatry and neurology, such as attention deficit disorder, psychosurgery, and antipsychotic drugs, and criticizing sociobiology on the basis of the weakest studies in the field and popular writings by journalists. He considered Wilson's discussion of the development of behavior in Sociobiology more sophisticated than that of Lewontin et al. He called the book "unfortunate", writing that its authors "offer little, except for pious hand-wringing and 'dialectical' rhetoric, that might help us to grapple with the great unanswered questions of our behavior and experience, normal and abnormal."

Bateson accused the book's authors of making it easy for themselves to criticize the genetic analysis of behavior by focusing on its weakest advocates, though he granted that their "counter-rhetoric" was "brilliant" and sometimes "illuminating." He also praised their discussion of measuring intelligence, writing that it was clear and "merciless" in its "exposure of poor method." He credited them with making a strong case against genetic explanations of both differences in IQ and schizophrenia, but did not consider their conclusions about either issue definitive, noting that both remained subject to dispute. He also found their criticism of ethology and sociobiology distorted by their personal biases, writing that despite errors by some proponents of sociobiology, Lewontin et al. were incorrect to dismiss it altogether. He noted that they ignored developments in the field that corrected some of the initial mistakes made by Wilson in Sociobiology. He also wrote that their claim that the belief that animals have a tendency not to mate with individuals familiar from early life is based on little evidence is incorrect. According to Bateson, even though he was predisposed to be sympathetic to Lewontin et al.′s approach, the value of their work was undermined by their poor scholarship and bad arguments, and the errors they made in discussing his field forced him to wonder about the value of their work even when it seemed strong, such as the portions concerning IQ and schizophrenia. Though agreeing with their views about the interaction between the social and physical environment, he accused them of wrongly suggesting that they were novel, when they were held by many others and it was doubtful whether anyone actually believed in the form of interactionism they criticized. He predicted that most scientists would simply disregard their book, and questioned whether discrediting genetic determinism would help create a more just society.

Dawkins accused the book's authors of promoting a "bizarre conspiracy theory of science" that suggested that sociobiology was a response to 1960s student activism, and of wrongly using quotations from non-sociobiologists such as the Conservative politician Patrick Jenkin and representatives of the British National Front and the French Nouvelle Droite as though they represented sociobiology. He described their claim that sociobiologists believe in genetic determinism as a "simple lie", and wrote that they employed the term "biological determinism" without having a clear idea of what they meant by it, and used the words "determinist" and "reductionist" simply as terms of abuse. He argued that biologists practice an appropriate form of "reductionism" that involves explaining complex wholes in terms of their parts, and never practice the form of "reductionism" criticized by Lewontin et al., which involves the idea that "the properties of a complex whole are simply the sum of those same properties in the parts". He maintained that the anthropologists Marshall Sahlins and Sherwood Washburn, praised by Lewontin et al. for their criticism of sociobiology, were both guilty of elementary misunderstandings of kin selection theory and that Lewontin knew enough about genetics that he should have realized this, and that the "dialectical biology" advocated by Lewontin et al. actually involved ideas similar to those suggested by Bateson and Dawkins himself. He attributed the positive reviews of the book from liberals to its authors' opposition to racism. Though he believed that its chapters on "IQ testing and similar topics" had some value, he nevertheless concluded that Lewontin et al.′s book was both poorly written and "silly, pretentious, obscurantist and mendacious". One of the book's authors threatened to sue Dawkins for having insinuated in his review that Lewontin, Rose, and Kamin were comparable to the discredited psychologist Cyril Burt for their dedication to ideology over facts.

Scientific and academic journals
Not in Our Genes received positive reviews from the biologist Peter Medawar in Nature, the geneticist Alan Emery in Trends in Neurosciences, and T. Benton in The Sociological Review, the biologist Franz M. Wuketits in the Journal of Social and Biological Structures, and a mixed review from the anthropologist Vernon Reynolds in Ethnic and Racial Studies. The book was also reviewed by Howard L. Kaye in Society.

Medawar described the book as a well-written and "in the main convincing rebuttal of a variety of determinist ideologies that have come to acquire the status of a public nuisance in biology and sociology." He endorsed its authors' criticism of IQ testing and their argument that determinism is an expression of conservative ideology. However, he was less satisfied by their criticism of reductionism, writing that despite its shortcomings reductive analysis was "the most successful research stratagem ever devised in science." He argued that it was also the way of understanding the world that made it easiest to see how it could be changed, something left-wing writers such as the authors of Not in Our Genes should appreciate. Emery welcomed the book as a refreshing attempt to create a more balanced view of the relevance of genetics to human behavior.

Benton described the book as an "immense achievement" and a well-written work accessible to a large audience. He complimented its authors for their historical survey of biological determinism and reductionism and their philosophical discussion of their dialectical alternative, and praised their discussions of IQ testing, biological determinist defences of patriarchy, psychiatry, schizophrenia, and sociobiology. He believed that they exposed the logical and conceptual problems of defining and measuring intelligence and identifying schizophrenia as a unitary disorder, as well as problems in the methodologies of heritability studies in both cases, including their assumption that "the determinants of any characteristic can be analysed as of two, separable kinds, heredity and environment, and that it makes sense to ask what proportion of each went into the making of the particular characteristic." He wrote that they dealt "selectively (and probably appropriately) with the work of Wilson and Dawkins". However, he believed that they did not have a fully developed alternative to biological and cultural determinism, questioned whether they were able to present a view different from cultural determinism, and noted that while they treated sociobiology as a form of genetic determinism, the main sociobiological writers had become "more sophisticated and qualified in their assumptions." He criticized them for using quotations in a selective fashion to argue that sociobiology is still an unqualified form of genetic determinism, and for equating "biological determinism and political reaction", noting that religious fundamentalists wanted to outlaw the teaching of evolutionary theory, and some progressive thinkers accept that biological processes shape personality.

Wuketits described the book as "concise and well written", and "more provocative than anything else written in opposition to genetic determinism and its ideological interpretation" because of its identification of sociobiology with the New Right. Although he agreed with many of Lewontin et al.′s views, he nevertheless considered them mistaken to view sociobiology as only an "ideological program", writing that it was primarily a scientific discipline and should not be dismissed simply for ideological reasons. He expressed regret that the book would give readers not familiar with the scientific background to sociobiology the impression that it is "nothing but a dangerous pseudoscientific ideology."

Reynolds argued that because Lewontin et al. dismissed biological approaches to understanding human nature, they invalidated their own claims about human nature, reducing them from scientific to political statements. He maintained, in opposition to Lewontin et al., that a single "committed political position" cannot be used to evaluate or criticize science, and that determining to what extent scientific claims are actually political in nature requires consideration of all political positions. He wrote that Lewontin et al. provided a dubious description of science that made it sound like a "right wing political movement", noting that their own credentials as scientists suggested that their politicized view of science was incorrect. However, he considered them correct to claim that the arguments of sociobiology were only "speculative suggestions" and that it was unfortunate if "the fascist right" adopted them as "scientific validation of its ideology", and that some scientific work, such as "IQ testing", is politicized science, and credited them with showing that "a good many branches of the science of human nature all revolve around the problem of inequality" and "mostly validate it." He also found their book enjoyable reading.

Other evaluations
The psychologist David P. Barash described Not in Our Genes as an example of the controversy surrounding sociobiology. He criticized Lewontin et al. for unfairly connecting sociobiology with "racist eugenics and misguided Social Darwinism." Dawkins accused Lewontin et al. of misquoting him, writing that they misrepresented his comment of genes, "they created us, body and mind", by altering the word "created" to "control". He maintained that genes do not control people in the way that "genetic determinism" suggests and accused Lewontin et al. of failing to understand that "it is perfectly possible to hold that genes exert a statistical influence on human behavior while at the same time believing that this influence can be modified, overridden or reversed by other influences."

The biologist Dean Hamer described Not in Our Genes as "a political rather than a scientific book". He expressed his disagreement with its politics. Nevertheless, Hamer commented that it taught him that the genetics of behavior is an emotionally and politically charged topic, especially where it concerns sexuality, and helped motivate him to change fields from metallothionein research to the genetics of homosexuality. The philosopher Daniel Dennett criticized Lewontin et al.′s account of reductionism, calling it "idiosyncratic". He also criticized their claim that memes involve a Cartesian view of the mind, arguing that memes are "a key (central but optional) ingredient in the best alternatives to Cartesian models", and accused them of being willing to use unscrupulous tactics to criticize people they considered determinists.

The author Richard Webster considered Not in Our Genes, "more subtle and valuable than the Marxism which frequently informs it". Rose commented that he and his co-authors in the book presented a critique of reductionism that was "systematic and based upon a coherent philosophical and political analysis which sees modern science as the inheritor of nineteenth-century mechanical materialism, itself tightly linked ideologically to a particular phase of the development of industrial capitalism." Writing with the sociologist Hilary Rose, he  noted that Not in Our Genes was one of a number of books that criticized sociobiology. Hilary Rose suggested that Not in Our Genes had been misread by critics, and credited its authors with offering "an alternative theory to biological determinism more robust than the rather weak concept of interaction between nature and nurture".

The historian of science Roger Smith described Not in Our Genes as an accessible critique of sociobiology. The psychologist Steven Pinker criticized Lewontin et al. for engaging in "innuendos about Donald Symons's sex life" and misquoting Dawkins. The sociologist Ullica Segerstråle suggested that Not in Our Genes, along with Gould's anti-sociobiological essays in Natural History, represented the height of the "critical attack" on sociobiology from its opponents. She noted that the book constituted a late admission from critics of sociobiology that some of them wanted a socialist society. According to Segerstråle, Rose threatened to sue Dawkins for libel for his review of the book, and although he did not make good on the threat, the evolutionary biologist W. D. Hamilton and other scientists made efforts to protect Dawkins, including seeking help from Segerstråle herself. She suggested that Rose's reaction to Dawkins's review may been influenced by the fact that while New Scientist, which commissioned reviews from Dawkins and Bateson, had expected the former to write a negative and the latter a positive review, both reviews were in fact negative, which may have disappointed Rose, a friend of Bateson. She also noted that the book's attack on sociobiology led Dawkins to identify himself as a sociobiologist for the first time.

The behavioral ecologist John Alcock argued that while Lewontin et al. were correct to maintain that no genes for social behavior had been identified as of 1984, it was nevertheless clear that thousands of genes are expressed in human brain cells and must be relevant to the structure of the brain and to human behavior. Pinker accused Lewontin et al. of using words such as "determinism" and "reductionism" as "vague terms of abuse". He also accused them of misrepresenting the views of scientists such as Wilson and Dawkins, falsely ascribing ridiculous beliefs to them. He saw them and other critics of "determinism" as misusing the term by using it to refer to the idea that people simply have a tendency to behave in a certain fashion. Pinker endorsed Dawkins's review of Not in Our Genes. He noted that Lewontin and Rose were themselves both "reductionist biologists", and attributed their rejection of the idea of human nature to their acceptance of Marxism.

See also
 Marxist philosophy
 Socialism

References

Bibliography
Books

 
 
 
 
 
 
 
 
 
 
 
 
 
 

Journals

External links
Critical review in New Scientist by Richard Dawkins.
Positive review in Nature by Sir Peter Medawar.

1984 non-fiction books
Biology books
Books about sociobiology
Books by Leon Kamin
Books by Richard Lewontin
Books by Steven Rose
English-language books
Marxist books
Pantheon Books books